Prakash Loungani is a macroeconomist known for his work on the difficulty of forecasting recessions (“the record of failure to predict recessions is virtually unblemished”), which has been featured in the Financial Times and The Guardian and on the BBC. He has nudged macroeconomists towards adopting the goal of “inclusive growth” through research on understanding and lowering unemployment (“Okun’s Law: Fit at 50?”); documenting the impact of austerity on inequality (“Painful Medicine”); and uncovering the role of unfettered capital mobility across national borders in lowering labor’s share of income (“Opening Up to Inequity”). His early research focused on understanding the impacts of oil prices on the economy. He is an advisor and senior personnel manager in the International Monetary Fund's Independent Evaluation Office. He blogs as The Unassuming Economist.

Career and education 
Loungani earned his BA from the University of Bombay (now the University of Mumbai) and his MA and PhD in economics from the University of Rochester. Prior to joining the IMF in 1998, he was an analyst at the Federal Reserve Board's International Finance Division (covering Asian economies during the 1997-98 crisis), a senior economist at the Federal Reserve Bank of Chicago during 1990-92, and an assistant professor at the University of Florida during 1986-90. He was an Adjunct Professor of Management at Vanderbilt University from 2001 to 2017.

Publications 
Loungani has over 30 publications in the leading field journals in economics, which places him among the top 5% of economists based on citations and impact, according to IDEAS/RePEc.  In addition to his technical work, he is known for his profiles of famous economists, including Robert Barro, Dani Rodrik, Jeff Sachs, Joseph Stiglitz and Stanley Fischer.

Selected works
The distributional effects of capital account liberalization, IMF Working Paper 15/243, Journal of Development Economics, 2018, vol. 30, 127-44 (with D. Furceri).
Okun’s law: fit at fifty? Journal of Money, Credit & Banking, 2017, vol. 49 (Oct.), 1413–41 (with L. Ball and D. Leigh).
Regional labor market adjustments in the United States, Review of Economics & Statistics, 2017, vol. 99 (May), 243-57 (with M. Dao and D. Furceri).
How accurate are private sector forecasts? Cross-country evidence from consensus forecasts of output growth, 2001, International Journal of Forecasting, Vol. 17, No. 3, pp. 419–32.
The role of energy in real business cycle models, 1992, Journal of Monetary Economics, Vol. 29, No. 2, pp. 173–89 (with In-Moo Kim).

References

External links 
 Prakash Loungani: Bio
 

Year of birth missing (living people)
Living people
University of Rochester alumni
University of Florida faculty
20th-century Indian economists
21st-century Indian economists